Zdzislaw R. Sikora (born 1952) is a German-born American artist. His work is included in the collections of the Smithsonian American Art Museum, the New Britain Museum of American Art, and the Museum of Fine Arts, Houston.

References

1952 births
Artists from Mannheim
20th-century American artists
21st-century American artists
Artists in the Smithsonian American Art Museum collection
Living people